Josh Meyers or Josh Myers may refer to:

Josh Meyers (actor) (born 1976), American actor and comedian 
Josh Meyers (ice hockey), (born 1985), American professional ice hockey player
Josh Myers (actor) (born 1986), British actor
Josh Myers (American football) (born 1998), American football center for the Green Bay Packers